Keysville is an unincorporated community in Carroll County, Maryland, United States. Terra Rubra was listed on the National Register of Historic Places in 1978.

References

Unincorporated communities in Carroll County, Maryland
Unincorporated communities in Maryland